Nissan platforms include:

 Renault-Nissan B platform
 Renault–Nissan C platform
 Renault–Nissan Common Module Family
 Renault–Nissan D platform
 Nissan F-Alpha platform
 Nissan FF-L platform
 Nissan MS platform
 Nissan FM platform
 Nissan S platform

Nissan platforms
Renault platforms